{{Infobox settlement

| official_name          = South Buru Regency
| native_name            = Kabupaten Buru Selatan
| native_name_lang       = id
| image_skyline          =
| image_alt              = 
| image_caption          = 
| type                   = Regency
| image_shield             = Lambang Kabupaten Buru Selatan.png
| shield_alt               = 
| motto                  = Lolik Lalen Fedak Fena(Unite Hearts to Build the Nation)
| image_map              = Locator map of South Buru Regency in Maluku.png
| map_alt                = 
| map_caption            = Location within Maluku
| coordinates            = 
| coordinates_footnotes  =
| subdivision_type       = Country
| subdivision_name       = Indonesia
| subdivision_type1      = Province
| subdivision_name1      = Maluku
| seat_type              = Capital
| seat                   = Namrole
| leader_title           = Regent
| leader_name            = Tagop Sudarsono Soulisa
| leader_title1 = Vice Regent
| leader_name1 = Buce Ayub Seleky
| area_footnotes         = 
| area_total_km2         = 5060	
| elevation_min_m        = 	
| elevation_max_m        = 
| elevation_m            = 
| population_as_of       = 2020 Census
| population_total       = 75410
| population_density_km2 = auto
| population_footnotes   = 
| timezone1              = IEST
| utc_offset1            = +9
| website                = 
| footnotes              = 
| area_code_type = Area code
| area_code = (+62) 913
| pushpin_map = Indonesia_Maluku#Indonesia
| pushpin_map_caption = Location in Maluku and Indonesia
}}
South Buru Regency is a regency of Maluku, Indonesia. It was created on 24 June 2008 by being split off from the existing Buru Regency. It is located on the island of Buru, of which it comprises the southern 40%. The Regency (which includes the smaller island of Ambalau to the southeast of Buru Island) covers an area of 5,060 km2, and it had a population of 53,671 at the 2010 Census, rising to 75,410 at the 2020 Census. The principal town lies at Elfule in Namrole District.

 Administrative Districts 
At the time of the 2010 Census the regency was divided into five districts (kecamatan), but a sixth  district (Fena Fafan) has been added by the splitting of the existing Leksula District. The six districts are tabulated below with their areas and their populations at the 2010 Census and the 2020 Census. The table also includes the location of the district headquarters, the number of administrative villages (rural desa and urban kelurahan'') in each district, and its postal codes.

Notes: (a) including three offshore islands. (b) including fifteen offshore islands. (c) the 2010 population of Fena Fafan District is included with the figure for Leksula District. (d) including four offshore islands. (e) including three offshore islands.

Climate
Namrole, the seat of the regency has a tropical rainforest climate (Af) moderate rainfall from October to March and heavy to very heavy rainfall from April to September. Unlike most parts of Indonesia, the southern part of Buru island experiences a rainfall maximum during the low-sun season due to local wind currents.

References

External links

Regencies of Maluku (province)